San Blas de los Sauces is a municipality and village in La Rioja Province, Argentina.

References

Populated places in La Rioja Province, Argentina